Caraguatatuba, widely known by its abbreviation Caraguá, is a city in the eastern part of the southern state of São Paulo in Brazil. It is part of the Metropolitan Region of Vale do Paraíba e Litoral Norte. The population is 123,389 (2020 est.) in an area of 485.10 km². Caraguatatuba is the largest city of São Paulo's north shore.
The economy of the Caraguatatuba is driven by agriculture and tourism. The urban area and farmlands are within the coastline and valley areas, the majority of the northern part are heavily forested and rarely serves any roads to that area.  The postal boundary dividing the 00000s and the 10000s lies to the southwestern boundary with Salesópolis.

Population

Geography 

Caraguatatuba is located between the Atlantic Ocean and the Serra do Mar and is home to the Parque Estadual da Serra do Mar. Its neighboring cities are  Natividade da Serra to the north, Ubatuba to the northeast, the Atlantic Ocean to the southeast (with the island of Ilhabela to the south), São Sebastião to the south, Salesópolis to the west and Paraibuna northwest.

Beaches

There are 17 beaches in Caraguatatuba from north to south, they are:

 Praia de Tabatinga (Tabatinga Beach)
 Praia da Mocóca (Mococa Beach)
 Praia da Cocanha (Cocanha Beach)
 Praia do Massaguaçú (Massaguaçu Beach)
 Praia do Capricórnio (Capricorn Beach)
 Praia Brava (Brave Beach)
 Praia Martim de Sá (Martim de Sá Beach)
 Prainha (Little Beach)
 Praia da Freira (Nun Beach)
 Praia do Camaroeiro (Shrimping Beach)
 Praia do Centro (Downtown Beach)
 Praia Grande (Big Beach)
 Praia do Indaiá (Indaiá Beach)
 Praia Pan Brasil (Pan Brasil Beach)
 Praia das Palmeiras (Palm Trees Beach)
 Praia do Romance (Romance Beach)
 Praia das Flecheiras (Flecheiras Beach)
 Praia do Porto Novo (New Port Beach)

References

External links 

  Official website
  Caraguatatuba at CityBrazil.com.br
  EncontraCaraguatatuba - Find everything about Caraguatatuba

 
Populated coastal places in São Paulo (state)
Populated places established in 1857
1857 establishments in Brazil